Alexandros Smyrlis (born 7 February 1993) is a Greek professional footballer who plays as a winger for Super League 2 club Diagoras.

References

1993 births
Living people
Greek footballers
Greece youth international footballers
Super League Greece players
Football League (Greece) players
Panionios F.C. players
A.O. Glyfada players
Fostiras F.C. players
Kallithea F.C. players
Irodotos FC players
Trikala F.C. players
Ionikos F.C. players
Association football wingers
Footballers from Patras